Aline Riera Ubiergo (born 21 January 1972 in Vélizy-Villacoublay) is a French footballer who played as a defender for the French women's national football team. She was part of the team at the UEFA Women's Euro 2001. On club level she played for FCF Juvisy in France.

References

External links
 
 
 

1972 births
Living people
French women's footballers
France women's international footballers
Women's association football defenders